Albert L. Schrecker (July 23, 1917 – January 4, 2000) was an American professional basketball player. Schrecker, a native of Pittsburgh, Pennsylvania, played in the National Basketball League in one game for the Pittsburgh Raiders during the 1944–45 season. He scored seven points in his lone appearance.

References

1917 births
2000 deaths
Amateur Athletic Union men's basketball players
American men's basketball players
Basketball players from Pittsburgh
Forwards (basketball)
Pittsburgh Raiders players